KILM (channel 64) is a television station licensed to Inglewood, California, United States, broadcasting the Bounce TV network to the Los Angeles area. It is owned and operated by the Ion Media subsidiary of the E. W. Scripps Company alongside San Bernardino–licensed Ion Television station KPXN-TV (channel 30). KILM and KPXN-TV share offices on West Olive Avenue in Burbank; through a channel sharing agreement, the two stations transmit using KPXN-TV's spectrum from an antenna atop Mount Wilson.

History

KILM began broadcasting on August 15, 1987 as KVVT, originally licensed to Barstow. It was the only independent commercial television station in the Mojave Desert region to provide local news programs. In 1989, the station switched to ABC as a result of the Mojave Desert at the time not receiving a good signal from KABC-TV (channel 7) in Los Angeles. It became KHIZ in 1992; that same year, KABC boosted its signal to the Mojave Desert, causing channel 64 to disaffiliate with ABC. (A similar situation occurred in Cleveland and Akron, Ohio where WEWS-TV (channel 5) and then-ABC affiliate WAKR/WAKC (channel 23, now sister station WVPX-TV) both aired ABC programming until 1996). In the mid-2000s, the station changed its format and service area to be transmitted in both the Los Angeles Metropolitan Area and the Inland Empire region. Multicultural Broadcasting purchased Sunbelt Television, Inc. in 2007. KHIZ eventually incorporated ethnic programming into its schedule.

At one time, KHIZ aired a weekday morning news program, Inland Empire Live, that was produced from the facilities of CBS affiliate WSEE-TV (channel 35) in Erie, Pennsylvania and distributed to KHIZ via satellite transmission.

FilmOn took over the station's operations under an LMA on September 1, 2012, at which point it became KILM. On November 25, 2013, FilmOn TV was removed and replaced with paid programming. On July 12, 2014, KILM dropped the all-paid programming lineup and replaced it with programming from the SonLife Broadcasting Network, a religious network owned by televangelist Jimmy Swaggart. On August 1, 2017, another LMA was made with a new network, Punch TV, which mainly consisted of public domain and brokered programming.

On June 1, 2018, KILM began channel sharing with Ion Television owned-and-operated station KPXN-TV (channel 30). As KPXN's broadcast radius does not adequately cover Barstow, KILM changed its city of license to Inglewood. Several weeks later, Ion Media Networks agreed to a $10 million purchase of the station, continuing a nationwide pattern of Ion buying out their channel sharing partners to retain full control of their spectrum. Multicultural terminated the Punch TV LMA at the start of August 2018, and began to carry a full schedule of paid programming from Corner Store TV while the sales process with Ion continued. The sale was completed on September 17, 2018, with Ion immediately converting the station to taking over the former channel space of KPXN-DT3 and its Ion Plus feed under KILM's 64.1 virtual channel, which allows Ion to utilize KILM's must-carry status for full-market coverage of Ion Plus.

On February 28, 2021, the station became an affiliate of Grit after Ion Plus was shut down.

On June 28, 2021, the station switched its affiliation to Bounce TV after the launch of TrueReal and Defy TV on KPXN's third and fourth subchannels.

Technical information

Subchannel

Analog-to-digital conversion
KHIZ shut down its analog signal, over UHF channel 64, on February 17, 2009, the original target date in which full-power television stations in the United States were to transition from analog to digital broadcasts under federal mandate (which was later pushed back to June 12, 2009). The station's digital signal remained on its pre-transition UHF channel 44. Through the use of PSIP, digital television receivers display the station's virtual channel as its former UHF analog channel 64, which was among the high band UHF channels (52-69) that were removed from broadcasting use as a result of the transition.

Former translator
On May 6, 2009, KHIZ added a low-power analog translator K39GY channel 39 (now KHIZ-LD, channel 2), a former TBN translator in Victorville. It was sold in 2015 to DTV America.

References

External links

E. W. Scripps Company television stations
ILM
Television channels and stations established in 1987
1987 establishments in California
Inglewood, California
Bounce TV affiliates